The Netherlands Antilles competed at the 1960 Summer Olympics in Rome, Italy.  The nation returned to the Olympic Games after boycotting the 1956 Summer Olympics, joining the Netherlands in protest of the Soviet Union's invasion of Hungary.

References
Official Olympic Reports

Nations at the 1960 Summer Olympics
1960
1960 in the Netherlands Antilles